Medial intermuscular septum can refer to:
 medial intermuscular septum of arm
 medial intermuscular septum of thigh